Thomas 'Tom' Edmund Oswell Bury (born 14 May 1958) is a former English first-class cricketer.

Born at Chelmsford in May 1958, Bury was educated at Charterhouse School, before going up to St Edmund Hall, Oxford. While studying at Oxford, Botton played first-class cricket for Oxford University in 1979 and 1980, making four appearances. He scored 32 runs in his four matches, with a highest score of 22. After graduating from Oxford, Bury entered into business.

References

External links

1958 births
Living people
Sportspeople from Chelmsford
People educated at Charterhouse School
Alumni of St Edmund Hall, Oxford
English cricketers
Oxford University cricketers
English businesspeople